St. Matthew's Lutheran Church is a historic Lutheran church located at 307 W. Court Street in Marion, McDowell County, North Carolina. It was built in 1935 and is a one-story, vernacular Late Gothic Revival-style church constructed with river rocks. The building features lancet windows and flying buttresses.

It was added to the National Register of Historic Places in 1991. It is located in the Main Street Historic District.

References

Lutheran churches in North Carolina
Churches in Marion, North Carolina
Churches on the National Register of Historic Places in North Carolina
Gothic Revival church buildings in North Carolina
Churches completed in 1935
20th-century Lutheran churches in the United States
National Register of Historic Places in McDowell County, North Carolina
Historic district contributing properties in North Carolina